Amit Hore (born 28 July 1963) is an Indian former cricketer. He played one first-class match for Bengal in 1987/88.

See also
 List of Bengal cricketers

References

External links
 

1963 births
Living people
Indian cricketers
Bengal cricketers
Cricketers from Kolkata